Furu River may refer to:

 Furu, a tributary of the Jiul de Vest in Hunedoara County, Romania
 Furu, a tributary of the Sărățel in Vrancea County, Romania

See also 
 Furu, a Central Sudanic language of the Democratic Republic of the Congo